Pandanus amaryllifolius is a tropical plant in the Pandanus (screwpine) genus, which is commonly known as pandan. It has fragrant leaves which are used widely for flavouring in the cuisines of Southeast Asia and South Asia.

Occurrence and habitat
Pandanus amaryllifolius is a true cultigen, and is believed to have been domesticated in ancient times. It is sterile and can only reproduce vegetatively through suckers or cuttings. It was first described from specimens from the Maluku Islands, and the rare presence of male flowers in these specimens may indicate that it is the origin of the species. However, as no other wild specimens have been found, this is still conjecture. The plant is grown widely throughout Southeast Asia and South Asia.

Botanical features 
The characteristic aroma of pandan is caused by the aroma compound 2-acetyl-1-pyrroline, found in the lower epidermal papillae; the compound gives white bread, jasmine rice, and basmati rice (as well as bread flowers Vallaris glabra) their typical smell. Though the plant is unknown in the wild, it is widely cultivated. It is an upright, green plant with fan-shaped sprays of long, narrow, blade-like leaves and woody aerial roots. The plant is sterile, with flowers only growing very rarely, and is propagated by cuttings.

Use

Culinary 

The taste of pandan has been described as floral, sweet, grassy, as well as like vanilla. It often has a subtle flavor or scent.

In Singapore, Malaysia, Indonesia and the Philippines, it is commonly called pandan or pandan wangi (fragrant pandan). The green juice acquired from its leaf is used extensively in Malaysian cuisine and Indonesian cuisine as green food colouring and flavouring agents that gave pleasant aroma for kue, a tapioca, flour or glutinous rice-based traditional cakes; including klepon, kue putu, dadar gulung, lapis legit, pandan cake, buko pandan salad, and buko pandan cake. The tied knot of bruised pandan leaf is also added into fragrant coconut rice to enhance the aroma.

In Sri Lanka, it is called rampé and it is grown almost in every household. Most of the Sri Lankan dishes use these leaves for aroma along with curry leaves. In India it is called  annapurna leaves; In Odisha annapurna leaves are used to lend aroma to rice and pithas, in Bangladesh, it is called pulao pata (পোলাও পাতা); and in the Maldives, it is called ran’baa along with the other variety of pandan there (Pandanus fascicularis), and is used to enhance the flavor of pulao, biryani, and sweet coconut rice pudding, or payesh if basmati rice is not used. It acts as a cheap substitute for basmati fragrance, as one can use normal, nonfragrant rice and with pandan the dish tastes and smells like basmati is used. 
The leaves are used either fresh or dried, and are commercially available in frozen form in Asian grocery stores of nations where the plant does not grow. They have a nutty, botanical fragrance that is used as a flavor enhancer in  many Asian cuisines, especially in rice dishes, desserts, and cakes.

The leaves are sometimes steeped in coconut milk, which is then added to the dish. They may be tied in a bunch and cooked with the food. They may be woven into a basket which is used as a pot for cooking rice. Pandan chicken, (Thai: ไก่ห่อใบเตย, kai ho bai toei), is a dish of chicken parts wrapped in pandan leaves and fried. The leaves are also used as a flavoring for desserts such as pandan cake and sweet beverages. Filipino cuisine uses pandan as a flavoring in some coconut milk-based dishes as well as desserts like buko pandan. It is also used widely in rice-based pastries such as suman and numerous sweet drinks and desserts.

Pandan leaves and their extract have also been used as a food preservative due to their antibacterial and antifungal properties (particularly against mold).

Pandan Tea is an increasingly popular use of the pandan leaves, often using green tea as a base and adding jasmine and other herbs for additional fragrance and flavor. Originating from the Central Highlands of Vietnam, tea made with pandan leaves has become very popular within Vietnam broadly. The process of creating pandan tea requires patience and produces a tea that has a sweet, fresh, and herbal flavor. 

Pandan tea can be found both online and within many local markets throughout Vietnam as its popularity becomes more well-known.

In October 2017, celebrity chef Nigella Lawson predicted that pandan would displace popular matcha and avocado toast. While the plant’s visibility on social networks, especially in the United Kingdom, increased in 2017, there was also pushback against reports that described Lawson as “discovering” a “new” ingredient, as pandan has been widely used in Asia for a long time.

Bottled pandan extract is available in shops, and often contains green food coloring.

Fragrance and traditional medicine 
The leaves are used in the perfume industry and traditional medicine. P. amaryllifolius essence may substitute for vanilla essence.

Studies have established repellent activity of P. amaryllifolius against American cockroaches (Periplaneta americana L.).

Air freshener 
The leaves possess a pleasant aroma and can be used as natural air fresheners. In Thailand, cab drivers sometimes use pandan for this purpose.

See also
 Domesticated plants and animals of Austronesia

References

Further reading 
 Li J. and Ho S.H. (2003). Pandan leaves (Pandanus amaryllifolius Roxb.) as a Natural Cockroach Repellent. Proceedings of the 9th National Undergraduate Research Opportunities Programme (2003-09-13).
 Van Wyk, Ben-Erik (2005). Food Plants of the World. Portland, Oregon: Timber Press, Inc.

External links 

 Spices: P. amaryllifolius

amaryllifolius
Spices
Asian cuisine
Taxa named by William Roxburgh